Meteli (Mätäle) is a rural locality (a selo) and the administrative centre of Metelinsky Selsoviet, Duvansky District, Bashkortostan, Russia. The population was 1,080 as of 2010. There are 10 streets.

Geography 
Meteli is located 74 km north of Mesyagutovo (the district's administrative centre) by road. Abdullino is the nearest rural locality.

References 

Rural localities in Duvansky District